Events from the year and

Incumbents
High King of Ireland: Domnall Ua Lochlainn

Events
Cellach Ua Sinaig inherits the position of Abbot of Armagh (the seventh in a series of members of the Ua Sinaig family, who had held the position without taking holy orders, and several of whom had been married).

Deaths
Muirgheas Ua Cú Ceannainn, King of Uí Díarmata.

References